Peter Čerešňák (born January 26, 1993) is a Slovak ice hockey player currently playing for HC Škoda Plzeň of the Czech Extraliga (ELH).

Career
He played with HC Dukla Trenčín in the Slovak Extraliga during the 2009–10 Slovak Extraliga season.  He was the New York Rangers 6th round draft pick (172nd overall) in the 2011 NHL Entry Draft.

Career statistics

Regular season and playoffs

International

References

External links

1993 births
HC Plzeň players
HC Vítkovice players
HK Dukla Trenčín players
Living people
New York Rangers draft picks
Peterborough Petes (ice hockey) players
Slovak ice hockey defencemen
Sportspeople from Trenčín
Ice hockey players at the 2018 Winter Olympics
Ice hockey players at the 2022 Winter Olympics
Medalists at the 2022 Winter Olympics
Olympic bronze medalists for Slovakia
Olympic medalists in ice hockey
Olympic ice hockey players of Slovakia
Slovak expatriate ice hockey players in Canada
Slovak expatriate ice hockey players in the Czech Republic